Doña María del Rosario de Silva y Gurtubay, Duchess of Alba de Tormes, 9th Marchioness of San Vicente del Barco, Grandee of Spain (Madrid, Spain; 4 April 1900 – 11 January 1934) was a Spanish aristocrat and socialite. Single heiress of all the titles of her father, Alfonso de Silva, 16th Duke of Híjar, and of the fortune of her mother, María del Rosario Gurtubay, the young Marchioness was one of the beauties of her time.

She married in London, on 7 October 1920, to Jacobo Fitz-James Stuart, 17th Duke of Alba, thus becoming the Duchess of Alba. She had one daughter, Cayetana, born in 1926.

The Duke and Duchess travelled to the United States in 1924, visiting Chicago, New York, Washington, and Long Island.

She stayed with her family in the Liria Palace in Madrid and died there of tuberculosis, aged only 33.

Ancestry

References 

1900 births
1934 deaths
Maria del Rosario
Spanish duchesses
Grandees of Spain
Tuberculosis deaths in Spain
20th-century deaths from tuberculosis